Old Protestant Cemetery may refer to:

 Old Protestant Cemetery in Macau
 Old Protestant Cemetery, George Town, Malaysia